Black Springs is a locality and former township in South Australia's Mid North region. It lies on the east side of the Barrier Highway between Gawler to the south and Burra to the north. The source of the Wakefield River is a few hundred metres south of the old township.

Governance 
Black Springs is governed at the local level by the District Council of Clare and Gilbert Valleys. It lies in the state electoral district of Frome and the federal electoral division of Grey.

See also 
 Clare, South Australia
 Hundred of Stanley

References

Towns in South Australia
Mid North (South Australia)